Alison Gordon (January 1, 1943 – February 12, 2015) was a Canadian journalist and mystery novelist.

Gordon was born in New York City to John King Gordon, often referred to as J. King Gordon, and his wife Ruth. Because her father was a diplomat, who worked with the United Nations, she lived in numerous cities during her childhood and teen aged years, including New York, Tokyo, Cairo, and Rome.  

Gordon attended Queen's University in Kingston, Ontario, Canada, but left before completing a degree.

Sports reporter
As a Toronto Star reporter, first assigned to cover the Toronto Blue Jays in 1979, she was one of Canada's first prominent women sportswriters. This made her the first woman doing sports coverage of the American League. At the time, women sportswriters were so rare that her membership card in the Baseball Writers' Association of America identified her as "Mr." Alison Gordon because the organization had made no provision for gender-neutral or female-specific cards. Gordon was also one of the first women allowed into a Major League Baseball locker room, which was controversial at the time but has since paved the way for many other female sports reporters.

She previously worked for the Canadian Broadcasting Corporation (CBC) in radio and television, including as a producer for As It Happens.

Novelist
She later began publishing a series of murder mystery novels focusing on Kate Henry, a female sports reporter and amateur detective investigating murders in the professional baseball world.

Personal
Gordon was the granddaughter of Canadian writer Ralph Connor, the daughter of academic J. King Gordon and the sister of journalist Charles Gordon. She wrote the afterword for the New Canadian Library edition of Connor's novel The Man from Glengarry.

Death
Gordon died in the Toronto East General Hospital on February 12, 2015, at the age of 72.

Works

Mystery
The Dead Pull Hitter (1988)
Safe at Home (1990)
Night Game (1992)
Striking Out (1995)
Prairie Hardball (1997)

Non-fiction
Foul Ball! Five Years in the American League (1984)

References

Canadian mystery writers
Canadian women novelists
Toronto Star people
Women mystery writers
Canadian women sportswriters
Baseball writers
20th-century Canadian novelists
20th-century Canadian women writers
1943 births
2015 deaths